Telephones - main lines in use:
327,000 (2012)

Telephones - mobile cellular:
2,600,000 (2012)

Telephone system:
modern system centered in Doha
domestic:
NA
international:
tropospheric scatter to Bahrain; microwave radio relay to Saudi Arabia and UAE; submarine cable to Bahrain and UAE; satellite earth stations - 2 Intelsat (1 Atlantic Ocean and 1 Indian Ocean) and 1 Arabsat

Radio broadcast stations:
AM 6, FM 5, shortwave 1 (1998)

Radios:
256,000 (1997)

Television broadcast stations:
1 (plus three repeaters) (1997)

Televisions:
230,000 (1997)

Internet

As of 2015, there are two ISPs in Qatar: Ooredoo (formerly Q-Tel) and Vodafone Qatar. There were 563,800 internet users in 2009. The country code (top level domain) is QA. ADSL was launched in 2002 in Qatar by Ooredoo. There were 25,000 ADSL users in 2005.

A 2015 report by the UN Broadband Commission for Sustainable Development ranked Qatar in first place among the developing countries by their respective percentage population using internet. The country also ranked second globally for percentage of households with internet.

See also
Telephone numbers in Qatar
Television in Qatar

References